Vishwajeet Kadam (born 13 January 1980) is a politician from the Indian state of Maharashtra. He is the son of former congress leader Patangrao Kadam, and was born and brought up in Pune. He is a MLA from Palus-Kadegaon (Vidhan Sabha constituency).

Early life and education 
Kadam has a B.E., MBA, PhD in Management and has also completed Management and Leadership in Education from Howard University.

Some know him as the Working President of Maharashtra Pradesh Congress Committee. Others know him as a Member of the AICTE (All India Council for Technical Education) and many more know him as the Secretary of Bharati Vidyapeeth.

Political career 
His secular ideology, passion for development, noteworthy social work and qualifications earned him a ticket as the Congress candidate for 2019 Maharashtra Legislative Assembly election & he won election by huge margin of 1,50,866 votes from Palus-Kadegaon (Vidhan Sabha constituency).

Positions held 

 Maharashtra Cabinet Minister of State (2019–2022)

External links 
 Vishwajeet Kadam Website

References

Living people
1980 births
Politicians from Pune
Marathi politicians
Indian National Congress politicians from Maharashtra